The Goa football team is an Indian football team representing Goa in Indian state football competitions including the  Santosh Trophy.

Goa made their Santosh Trophy debut in the 1964 Madras Nationals. They have appeared in the Santosh Trophy finals 13 times, and have won the trophy 5 times.

Players and Staff
The following 20 players were called up prior to the 2019-20 Santosh Trophy qualification:

Current Players

Coaching staff
As of 03 February 2023

Record since 2000

Honours

State
 Santosh Trophy
 Winners (5): 1982–83, 1983–84, 1989–90, 2005–06, 2008–09
 Runners-up (8): 1978–79, 1991–92, 1995–96, 1995–96, 1997–98, 1998–99, 2001–02, 2016–17
National Games
 Silver medal (2): 1997, 2001
 Bronze medal (1): 2011
 B.C. Roy Trophy
 Winners (2): 1979–80, 1982–83
 Runners-up (5): 1983–84, 1989–90, 2001–02, 2002–03, 2005–06
 Mir Iqbal Hussain Trophy
 Winners (2): 1988–89, 1990–91
 Runners-up (1): 1991–92
 M. Dutta Ray Trophy
 Winners (6): 1993, 1999, 2001, 2006, 2007, 2010
 Runners-up (1): 2000

Others
 Bordoloi Trophy
 Runners-up (1): 1976

See also
 Goans in football

References

External links
 Goa Football Association website

Football in Goa
Santosh Trophy teams